Close Enough for Rock 'n' Roll is the seventh studio album by the Scottish hard rock band Nazareth, released in 1976.

The lead track, "Telegram", describes the band's experience while touring of hangovers, travel by aeroplane and limousine, customs, FM radio, girls, breakfast, press reception, soundcheck and finally the show over a guitar riff that bursts into a short version of the Byrds hit before returning to the riff and the story.  It includes the album title in the lyrics. This references a saying among guitar players: "It doesn't matter if your guitar isn't fully in tune, as long as it's 'close enough for rock 'n' roll.'"  "Telegram" (parts 1–3 only) was Nazareth's concert opener for many years, including the 1981 shows recorded for the Snaz album.

Track listing

Credits

Band members 
 Dan McCafferty – lead vocals
 Manny Charlton – guitar, producer
 Pete Agnew – bass, backing vocals, guitar, piano
 Darrell Sweet – drums, percussion

Other credits 
 Nick Blagona – engineer
 John Punter – engineer
 Hipgnosis – sleeve design and photos

Chart performance

Certifications

References 

Nazareth (band) albums
1976 albums
Albums with cover art by Hipgnosis
A&M Records albums
Vertigo Records albums